Events from the year 1864 in China.

Incumbents 
 Tongzhi Emperor (4st year)
 Regent: Empress Dowager Cixi
 Regent: Prince Gong

Events 

 Taiping Rebellion
 Battle of Fujian
 Battle of Hubei
 July 1864 - Third Battle of Nanking, Fall of Tianjing, Taiping Rebellion mostly ends
 Battle of Changzhou
 Nian Rebellion
 Miao Rebellion (1854–73)
 Dungan Revolt (1862–77)
 Panthay Rebellion
 Tongzhi Restoration

Deaths 
 Hong Xiuquan